Ndasa is a Bantu language spoken in Gabon and the Congo.

References

Kele languages